Enos Abijah Mills  (April 22, 1870 – September 21, 1922) was an American naturalist, author and homesteader. He was the main figure behind the creation of Rocky Mountain National Park.

Enos Mills was inducted into the Colorado Business Hall of Fame by Junior Achievement–Rocky Mountain and the Denver Metro Chamber of Commerce in 2016.

Early and personal life 
Mills was born in Pleasanton, Kansas, near the later site of the Mine Creek Battlefield of the Civil War. His parents were Enos Mills Sr., and Ann Lamb Mills. He had ten brothers and sisters, who are listed in order of birth: Augustus, Elkhanah, Mary, Naomi Victoria, Ruth, Sarah, Ellen, Sabina Isabelle (Belle), Horace, Enoch Joe. He married Esther Burnell on August 12, 1918. Their only child, Enda Mills, was born on April 27, 1919.

Colorado and Montana 
He moved to Colorado in 1884 at the age of 14. He suffered from an unidentifiable illness which he later discovered to be an allergy to wheat.

At age 15, he made his first ascent of Longs Peak. Over the course of his life, he made the trip 40 times by himself and nearly 300 additional times as a guide.
He built his homestead near Longs Peak and the town of Estes Park, Colorado at the age of 15, completing it at 16.

Enos filed his homestead application on February 3 1893 and received his patent on 16 November 1898 for 160 acres. His tract is located in Larimer County, Colorado on the west half of the southwest quarter of section 26 (80 acres) and the west half of the northwest quarter of section 35 (80 acres) of township 4 north and range 73 west of the 6th PM.

In the winter of 1887 he moved to Butte, Montana. There he lived and worked intermittently until 1902, spending some of his summers traveling the West Coast of the United States, Alaska, and Europe. In 1889, he had a chance encounter with famed naturalist John Muir on a San Francisco beach, and from that point on Mills dedicated his life to conservation activism, lecturing, and writing.

In 1902, Mills returned to Colorado and purchased the Longs Peak House near Estes Park from his cousin, Elkanah Lamb. Mills hired and trained nature guides there, who guided many people up Longs Peak and the surrounding area. His methods of nature interpretation are still taught to students in the field of interpretation.

From 1902 to 1906, Mills was a Colorado State Snow Observer, a position in which he measured the snow depths to predict spring and summer runoff. Following this position, he served as government lecturer on forestry from 1907 to 1909.

Naturalist and author

Mills authored several articles and books on nature and Estes Park area, beginning in the first decade of the 20th century. His speeches generally focused on the lives of trees, forestry issues, preservation of natural lands, and the lives of wild animals. Often in his speeches and written articles he encouraged people of all ages to get outside and into nature.

Mills continued to lecture and write books until his death in 1922.

Rocky Mountain National Park
Mills led the fight to preserve the area around Longs Peak as a national park, and used his speeches, his writing, and photography to lobby for the park. He wanted a park of about 1,000 square miles that would cover the area from Wyoming to Pikes Peak. Mills was aided by the Sierra Club, Daughters of the American Revolution, American Civic Association, the General Federation of Women's Clubs and especially, Freelan Oscar Stanley, founder of the Stanley Hotel. President Woodrow Wilson signed into law the bill that made the Rocky Mountain National Park the tenth national park on January 26, 1915. It was 352.5 square miles. He was called the "Father of Rocky Mountain National Park" by the Denver Post.

Death
Mills died at age 52 in 1922. He died from blood poisoning from an infected tooth.

His wife, Esther Burnell Mills, was co-author with Hildegarde Hawthorne of the book Enos Mills of the Rockies, which was published in 1935. Mills Lake, within the Rocky Mountain National Park, was named in his honor.

Publications

References

Further reading

External links 
 Short radio episode "Universal Kinship" from The Adventures of a Nature Guide, 1920, by Enos A. Mills, California Legacy Project.
 
 
 
 Enos Mills Cabin Website

1922 deaths
1870 births
American naturalists
People from Butte, Montana
People from Estes Park, Colorado
People from Pleasanton, Kansas